Scary Movie spoofs two movies which are Scream and I Know What You Did Last Summer. The movie revolves around a group of teens who, accidentally, kill a pedestrian and keep it a secret. It comes back to haunt them when a vicious killer, whose mask is similar to that of Ghostface from the Scream franchise, starts to kill them because of what they did. Most of the movie revolves around how Cindy tries to deal with the killer.

Cindy Campbell 

 Portrayed by Anna Faris

Cindy is a ditzy brunette who is constantly eluding her sex-crazed boyfriend, Bobby, and has a drug using father. She becomes the killer’s next target after Drew Decker, a classmate of Cindy’s from B.A. Corpse High School, is murdered. After finally giving up her virginity to Bobby, he reveals himself as the killer. However, the real masked murderer shows up and engages in a martial arts fight with Cindy. Police start to interrogate Cindy after the fact to find the killer, and she realizes the clues point to Buffy’s brother, Officer Doofy.

Bobby Prinze 

 Portrayed by Jon Abrahams

Bobby is Cindy’s boyfriend and a fellow student at B.A. Corpse High School. Bobby was arrested once for suspicion of being the killer, but he was let go once the killer was spotted when he was in jail. Bobby, later, fakes being attacked by the killer. He is then found alive and admits that he and Ray have been the ones killing their friends. Bobby also admits that he has been having a love affair with Ray, and that they abducted Cindy’s father. When the actual killer shows up, he kills both Bobby and Ray.

Greg Phillippe 

 Portrayed by Lochlyn Munro

Greg is Buffy’s brutish, unintelligent boyfriend, and he was the one that forcibly swore everyone to secrecy after murdering a pedestrian.

Buffy Gilmore 

 Portrayed by Shannon Elizabeth

Buffy is Greg’s girlfriend and is a promiscuous, rich girl. Buffy is the sister of Officer Doofy and claims to be Cindy’s best friend. She is also very sarcastic when it comes to confronting the killer in true horror spoof movie fashion.

Shorty Meeks 

 Portrayed by Marlon Wayans

Shorty is Brenda’s brother, and he is constantly smoking pot and hanging out with his friends. Shorty ends up being killed by Bobby which is how Cindy finds out that Bobby and Ray were killing their friends.

Brenda Meeks 

 Portrayed by Regina Hall

Brenda is Shorty’s sister and Cindy’s best friend. Brenda is also dating Ray, despite the fact that he is interested in men. She gets murdered in the theater by the killer as well as the theatergoers due to being obnoxious and annoying during the showing of “Shakespeare in Love.”

Ray Wilkins 

 Portrayed by Shawn Wayans

Ray is a football player at B.A. Corpse High School who has a hidden relationship with Bobby. Ray was fake killed in the movie theater by an unknown person with a knife through the ears when he was in the restroom. He teams up with Bobby to pretend to be the killer but ends up getting brutally murdered by the actual killer.

Gail Hailstorm 

 Portrayed by Cheri Oteri

Gail is a pushy television reporter who will do anything to get information, including flirting with Officer Doofy in order to get a lead on the brutal killings. She is also the author of a book called, You’re Dead, I’m Rich.

Doofy Gilmore 

 Portrayed by Dave Sheridan

Doofy Gilmore, or Officer Doofy, is Buffy’s brother and is portrayed to be extraordinarily dumb, but he is the real killer of the movie. At the end of the movie, when Cindy finds out he is the killer, he is tearing off his disguise and ends up getting away. He also is portrayed to have a sexual relationship with his vacuum cleaner.

References 

Lists of film characters